The International Volunteer Day for Economic and Social Development (5 December), more commonly referred to as International Volunteer Day (IVD), is an international observance mandated by the UN General Assembly in 1985. It offers an opportunity for volunteer-involving organizations and individual volunteers to promote volunteerism, encourage governments to support volunteer efforts, and recognize volunteer contributions to the achievement of the Sustainable Development Goals (SDGs) at local, national, and international levels.

International Volunteer Day is celebrated by many non-governmental organizations, civil society, and the private sector, among others. It is also marked and supported by the United Nations Volunteers (UNV) programme.

UNV coordinates a campaign to promote IVD every year, building on the impact volunteers have in communities, nationally, and globally for peace and development.

In 2018 the focus of IVD is not only to celebrate volunteerism in all its facets but also to highlight the role that volunteers play in building resilient communities. It is worth noting that current estimates equate the global volunteer workforce to 109 million full-time workers. 30 percent of volunteering takes place formally through organizations, associations, and groups; and 70 percent occurs through informal engagement between individuals. Overall, 60% of the informal volunteers are women.

For IVD 2021 celebrations, UNV worked with UN agencies, partners, Member States, and governments across the world to recognise and support the spirit of volunteerism to create a more inclusive and sustainable future for all – people and planet. Therefore, the campaign message - “Volunteer now for our common future.”

Background

The International Volunteer Day for Economic and Social Development was adopted by the United Nations General Assembly through Resolution A/RES/40/212 on 17 December 1985.

In 2012, in response to evolving experiences and recommendations, the United Nations Volunteers (UNV) programme spearheaded a Five-Year International Volunteer Day Strategy, with the aim to make it more globally recognized and grassroots-owned.

Celebration of International Volunteer Day (IVD) and the themes:

IVD is celebrated each year in over 80 countries annually. The IVD website receives around 50,000 page views every year, with around 150 stories posted which highlight over 50,000 volunteers, photos and videos of celebrations worldwide.

IVD 2022 – "Together, act now"

The theme for this IVD is solidarity though volunteering — "Together, act now". The value of volunteers will be celebrated and recognized. While the world grapples with humanitarian and development challenges — amid wars and climate change, we need volunteers to work together for the common good.

IVD 2021 – "Volunteer now for our common future"

IVD 2021 is focused on decision-makers more than in the past. It is important to integrate volunteers and the spirit of volunteerism into national and global implementation strategies to achieve the SDGs and build an inclusive world. By volunteering, people take action to improve their lives and the lives of those around them. Therefore, the theme for this year’s campaign is “Volunteer now for our common future”.

IVD 2020 – "Together We Can Through Volunteering"

IVD 2020 emphasized gratitude for volunteers and their efforts during the COVID-19 pandemic.

IVD 2019 – "For an Inclusive Future"

IVD 2019 focused on the diversity of volunteers and how volunteers themselves contribute to inclusion.

IVD 2018 – "Volunteers build Resilient Communities"

IVD 2018 celebrated volunteer efforts that strengthen local ownership and the resilience of the community in the face of natural disasters, economic stresses and political shocks. The event on 5 December 2018 focused on how volunteers can build resilient communities. 

IVD 2017 - "Volunteers Act First. Here. Everywhere."

The focus of IVD 2017 was to recognize the positive solidarity of volunteers around the world who answer calls in times of crisis, helping save lives today and supporting those who want to continue living their lives with dignity tomorrow.

IVD 2016 - "Global Applause – give volunteers a hand"

Under this theme, IVD presented a round of global applause to celebrate volunteers everywhere and encouraged others to join in and contribute to peace and sustainable development.

IVD 2015 - "Your world is changing. Are you? Volunteer!"

The goal of IVD 2015 was to start a dialogue about how volunteerism is vital to the success of the Sustainable Development Goals (SDGs) and the 2030 Agenda.

IVD 2014 - "Make change happen, volunteer!"

The goal of IVD 2014 was to highlight the contribution of volunteers in engaging people from the grassroots in decision-making processes, ultimately creating spaces for participation that lead to stronger governance, social cohesion, peace and sustainable development.

IVD 2013 - "Young. Global. Active."

The goal of the event was to pay special tribute to the contribution of youth volunteers to global peace and sustainable human development, highlighting that young people act as agents of change in their communities.

IVD 2012 - "Celebrate volunteering"

The event celebrated its commitment and hope for a better world. The main focus of IVD 2012 was awareness of and recognition for volunteers and volunteer organizations.

A focus on partnership and development

Through the years, International Volunteer Day has been used strategically: many countries have focused on volunteers’ contributions to achieving the Sustainable Development Goals, a set of time-bound targets to combat poverty, hunger, disease, health, environmental degradation and gender equality. [1]

International Volunteer Day (IVD) celebrates active volunteers and attracts new volunteers in the North and in the South, with a special focus on promoting South-South cooperation. 

The organization of International Volunteer Day is generally the result of a partnership between the UN system, governments, volunteer-involving organizations and committed individuals. Representatives from the media or academia, foundations, the private sector, faith groups, and sports and recreational organizations are often involved too.

The General Assembly invited Governments to observe annually, on 5 December, the International Volunteer Day for Economic and Social Development (resolution 40/212 of 17 December 1985) and urged them to take measures to heighten awareness of the important contribution of volunteer service, thereby stimulating more people in all walks of life to offer their services as volunteers, both at home and abroad.

The United Nations General Assembly, in its resolution 52/17 of 20 November 1997, proclaimed 2001 as the International Year of Volunteers (IYV). The year was conceived to further the recognition of volunteers, facilitate their work, create a communication network and promote the benefits of voluntary service.

In 2001, the International Year of Volunteers, the General Assembly adopted a set of recommendations on ways in which Governments and the United Nations system could support volunteering and asked that they be given wide dissemination (resolution 56/38 of 5 December 2001).

The United Nations General Assembly, in its resolution 57/106 of 22 November 2002, called upon the United Nations Volunteers (UNV) programme to ensure that the potential of International Volunteer Day is fully realized.

On 18 December 2008, the General Assembly decided that on or around 5 December 2011, two plenary meetings of the sixty-sixth session of the General Assembly should be devoted to the follow-up to the International Year of Volunteers and the commemoration of its tenth anniversary (resolution 63/153).

Online Volunteering Award

Traditionally, on International Volunteer Day (5 December), UNV calls for nominations and launches the UNV Online Volunteering Award.  A jury made up of UNV representatives and external experts in volunteerism and development cooperation review the nominations and selects the winners. 

The United Nations Volunteers (UNV) programme invites citizens worldwide to be inspired by the winner's stories and participate in the global voting for their favorite winner. The team that gets the most votes is announced as the public's favorite on the International Day of Happiness.

The purpose of the award is to recognize online volunteers’ contributions towards achieving the Sustainable Development Goals, to showcase the many ways in which online volunteers can strengthen the capacities of organizations, and demonstrate the difference volunteers can make to peace and development projects by sharing their time, skills and expertise over the Internet.

See also
Association for Volunteer Administration
Association of Leaders in Volunteer Engagement
Global Youth Service Day
Good Deeds Day
International Year of Volunteers
Join Hands Day
List of awards for volunteerism and community service
Make A Difference Day
Mandela Day
Mitzvah Day
MLK Day of service
 National Cleanup Day
 National Philanthropy Day (USA and Canada)
National Public Lands Day (USA)
NetDay
Peace Day
Random Acts of Kindness Day
September 11 National Day of Service (9/11 Day)
Sewa Day
Subbotnik Day
United Nations Volunteer
 World Cleanup Day
World Humanitarian Day
World Kindness Day

References

External links

International Volunteer Day webpage
United Nations System Calendar of Media Events

Volunteers, International Day for
December observances
Volunteering